A leadership election in the Australian Labor Party, then the opposition party in the Parliament of Australia, was held on 26 April 1928. It saw the election of Leader James Scullin as leader following the retirement of sitting leader Matthew Charlton.

Background
Scullin, then deputy-leader of the ALP, was returned in the caucus ballot unopposed as Charlton's successor. The contest to fill the now vacant deputy-leadership was far less decisive. Arthur Blakeley narrowly defeated Ted Theodore for the position. Norman Makin was elected secretary of the party, to fill the vacancy caused by Blakeley's elevation to deputy leader.

See also
1928 Australian federal election

References

Australian Labor Party leadership spills
Australian Labor Party leadership election